Richard McCormick may refer to:
Richard A. McCormick (1922–2000), Catholic Jesuit priest and moral theologian
Richard Cunningham McCormick (1832–1901), Governor of Arizona Territory, 1866–1869, and U.S. Congressman from New York, 1895–1897
Richard D. McCormick (born 1940), American businessman
Richard J. McCormick (born 1941), Catholic Salesian priest convicted of rape of boys
Richard Levis McCormick (born 1947), American and president of Rutgers University, 2002–2012
Richard P. McCormick (1916–2006), American presidential historian
Rich McCormick (born 1968), American politician from the state of Georgia